Bolsheozyorka is a rural locality (a selo) in Annovsky Selsoviet of Ivanovsky District, Amur Oblast, Russia. The population was 245 as of 2018. There are 6 streets.

Geography 
Bolsheozyorka is located near the left bank of the Ivanovka River, 13 km northeast of Ivanovka (the district's administrative centre) by road. Lugovoye is the nearest rural locality.

References 

Rural localities in Ivanovsky District, Amur Oblast